Clifford Osbourne Jarvis (August 26, 1941 – November 26, 1999) was an American hard bop and free jazz drummer, who in the 1980s moved to London, England, where he spent the remainder of his career.

Biography
Clifford Jarvis, the son of Malcom “Shorty” Jarvis was born in Boston, Massachusetts, United States, where he studied at Berklee College of Music in the 1950s.

Moving to New York City, he established himself in jazz between 1959 and 1966, by recording with bebop and hard-bop musicians including Randy Weston, Yusef Lateef, Freddie Hubbard, Barry Harris, Jackie McLean, John Patton, Chet Baker, Kenny Drew, Walter Davis, and Elmo Hope, and playing with Grant Green and Rahsaan Roland Kirk.

He worked and recorded with musicians associated with free jazz, including Sun Ra (from 1962 to 1976), Pharoah Sanders, Sonny Simmons, Alice Coltrane, and Archie Shepp.

During the 1980s, Jarvis moved to England, where he played with younger musicians including Courtney Pine. He also worked as a music educator at Chats Palace Arts Centre in London and Pyramid Arts Development in Dalston. Jarvis continued teaching until his death in 1999.

Discography

As leader
1986: Little Red Moon (Soul Note)

As sideman
With Chet Baker
 Chet Baker Plays the Best of Lerner and Loewe (Riverside, 1959)
With Alice Coltrane
 Carnegie Hall '71 (Hi Hat, 2018)
With Kenny Drew
Ruby, My Dear (SteepleChase, 1977)
With Curtis Fuller
 Images of Curtis Fuller (Savoy, 1960)
With Barry Harris
Newer Than New (Riverside, 1961)
Chasin' the Bird (Riverside, 1962)
With Elmo Hope
The Final Sessions (Evidence, 1966 [1996])
With Freddie Hubbard
 Open Sesame (Blue Note, 1960)
 Hub-Tones (Blue Note, 1962)
 Blue Spirits (Blue Note, 1966)
With Jackie McLean
Right Now! (Blue Note, 1965)
With Archie Shepp
Little Red Moon (Soul Note, 1985)
Splashes (L+R, 1987)
With Sonny Simmons
Burning Spirits (Contemporary, 1971)
With Jukka Syrenius Band
Memories of tomorrow"( Finland, TCH-LP1, 1983)With Sun Ra When Sun Comes Out (Saturn, 1963)
 Nothing Is… (ESP, 1966)With John PattonThat Certain Feeling (Blue Note, 1968)With Randy Weston Live at the Five Spot (United Artists, 1959)With Harry Beckett' Les Jardins Du Casino'' (ITM, 1993)

References

1941 births
1999 deaths
American jazz drummers
Free jazz drummers
Bebop drummers
Sun Ra Arkestra members
Black Saint/Soul Note artists
African-American jazz musicians
20th-century American drummers
American male drummers
American male jazz musicians
20th-century American male musicians